This article lists important figures and events in Malayan public affairs during the year 1957, together with births and deaths of significant Malayans. Malaya became independent from British colonial rule on 31 August 1957.

Political figures (from 31 August 1957)

Federal level
Yang di-Pertuan Agong: Tuanku Abdul Rahman of Negeri Sembilan
Raja Permaisuri Agong: Tuanku Kurshiah of Negeri Sembilan
Prime Minister: Tunku Abdul Rahman Putra Al-Haj
Deputy Prime Minister: Datuk Abdul Razak Hussein

State level
 Sultan of Johor: Sultan Ibrahim
 Sultan of Kedah: Sultan Badlishah
 Sultan of Kelantan: Sultan Ibrahim
 Raja of Perlis: Tuanku Syed Putra
 Sultan of Perak: Sultan Yussuff Izzuddin Shah
 Sultan of Pahang: Sultan Abu Bakar Ri'ayatuddin Al-Muadzam Shah
 Sultan of Selangor: Sultan Hisamuddin Alam Shah (Deputy Yang di-Pertuan Agong)
 Sultan of Terengganu: Sultan Ismail Nasiruddin Shah
 Yang di-Pertuan Besar Negeri Sembilan: Tunku Munawir (Regent)
 Yang di-Pertua Negeri of Penang: Raja Tun Uda
 Yang di-Pertua Negeri of Malacca: Tun Leong Yew Koh

(Source: Malaysian Department of Informations)

Events 

 15 August – The Federal Legislative Council passed the first Federation of Malayan constitution from the Reid Commission.
 27 August – The Federation of Malayan constitution took effect for the first time.
 30 August – Stadium Merdeka was officially opened.
 31 August – Malaya achieved its independence from Britain, and joined the Commonwealth of Nations.
 12:00 am – In Selangor Club Padang, The Union Jack flag was lowered and replaced by the independent Federation of Malayan flag.
 7:30 am – The proclamation of independence was held in Stadium Merdeka, Kuala Lumpur.
 31 August–7 September – The Merdeka Tournament or Pestabola Merdeka was held for the first time after Malayan independence.
 1 September – Tuanku Abdul Rahman of Negeri Sembilan was installed as the first Yang di-Pertuan Agong.
 2 September – Malaya officially admitted as the 88th United Nations member.
 October – SMK Assunta was established.
 3 October – The Agreement Between the Government of the United Kingdom of Great Britain and Northern Ireland and the Government of the Federation of Malaya on External Defense and Mutual Assistance was finalized.
 30 October – The Alliance (the predecessor of the Barisan Nasional political coalition in Malaysia) was officially registered as a political organization.
 1 December – The Malayan Public Records Office (now known as the Malaysian National Archives or Arkib Negara) was formed.
 30 December – The first Malay Cultural Congress was held at Melaka.

Births
 17 March – Mohammad Nizar Jamaluddin – Politician and Menteri Besar Perak (2008–2009)
 25 April – Jalil Hamid – Actor and comedian
 25 April – Abu Bakar Omar – Actor
 4 July - M. Nasir - Singer, composer and actor
 9 July – Salleh Said Keruak – Politician
 14 August – Khalid bin Abdul Samad – Politician
 14 September – Azahari Husin – Militant involved in 2002 Bali bombings (died 2005)
 20 October – Mohd Shafie Apdal – Politician
 22 November – Wan Jamak Wan Hassan – Footballer
 Unknown date – Hassan Sakimon – Deputy director of Malaysian Prison Department
 Unknown date – Maimon Mutalib – Actor (died 2013)
 Unknown date – Shaharuddin Thamby – Actor
 Unknown date – Zaiton Sameon – Singer / poker player
 Unknown date – Siti Rohani Wahid – Actor (died 2010)

Deaths

 See also 
 1957
 Pre-Independence = 1956 in Malaysia | 1958 in Malaysia = Post-Independence'''
 History of Malaysia

 
Years of the 20th century in Malaysia
Malaya
1950s in Malaya
Malaya